The 1959 Florida A&M Rattlers football team was an American football team that represented Florida A&M University as a member of the Southern Intercollegiate Athletic Conference (SIAC) during the 1959 NCAA College  Division football season. The team was ranked No. 14 in the final UPI coaches small colleges poll. The team played its home games at Bragg Memorial Stadium in Tallahassee, Florida.

The team's statistical leaders included Clarence Childs with 537 rushing yards, Theodore Richardson with 354 passing yards, and Williams Barber with 116 receiving yards.

Schedule

References

Florida AandM
Florida A&M Rattlers football seasons
Black college football national champions
College football undefeated seasons
Florida AandM Rattlers football